Reginald Allender Smith (1873 – 18 January 1940) was an archaeologist of Palaeolithic to late Anglo-Saxon materials. He was Keeper of British and Medieval Antiquities at the British Museum from 1927-1938, and authored several books and British Museum catalogues.

Smith attended University College, Oxford. He was first appointed to a job at the British Museum in 1898, and was succeeded by T D Kendrick upon his retirement from the role of Keeper. He was elected a Fellow of the Society of Antiquaries in 1903, serving as vice president from 1926 to 1929 and as director from 1929 to 1940.

He was on the side of the skeptics during the inquiry as to whether or not Piltdown man was genuine, known for having offered a single line of testimony concerning a "bone implement" purported to be a tool. He remarked simply, it was reported, on "the possibility of the bone having been found and whittled in recent times."

Selected publications
  
 A Guide to the Antiquities of Roman Britain in the Department of British and Mediaeval Antiquities. London: Trustees of the British Museum, 1922.
 British Museum Guide to Anglo-Saxon Antiquities. British Museum. Department of British and Mediaeval Antiquities, 1923. Reprinted: Ipswich, Suffolk: Anglia Pub., 1993.
 Flints: An Illustrated Manual of the Stone Age for Beginners. London: British Museum, 1928.

Notes

1873 births
1940 deaths
Employees of the British Museum
British archaeologists
British non-fiction writers
British male writers
Fellows of the Society of Antiquaries of London
Male non-fiction writers